Jure Čolak (born August 21, 1989) is a Croatian-German footballer who currently plays for FC Gießen in the Regionalliga Südwest. He is the brother of Antonio-Mirko Čolak.

Club career

Wormatia Worms
On 7 January 2019, Wormatia Worms announced the signing of Čolak.

References

External links

 Jure Čolak Interview

1989 births
Living people
Footballers from Split, Croatia
German people of Croatian descent
Association football central defenders
German footballers
Croatian footballers
1. FC Kaiserslautern II players
TSV 1860 Munich II players
SV Waldhof Mannheim players
SV Wacker Burghausen players
SC Wiedenbrück 2000 players
TSV Steinbach Haiger players
FC 08 Homburg players
KF Shkëndija players
Siah Jamegan players
Wormatia Worms players
FC Gießen players
3. Liga players
Regionalliga players
Macedonian First Football League players
Persian Gulf Pro League players
Croatian expatriate footballers
Expatriate footballers in North Macedonia
Croatian expatriate sportspeople in North Macedonia
Expatriate footballers in Iran
Croatian expatriate sportspeople in Iran